Western Pride Football Club is a soccer club based in Ipswich, Queensland. The club is best known for winning the NPL Queensland Grand Final in 2017. Pride's Senior Men currently play in the Football Queensland Premier League, following relegation in 2018, while the juniors and Senior Women teams play in their respective NPL or FQPL Queensland competitions.

The club was founded in 2012 by a new entity called Football Ipswich, set up by local football clubs to represent the Greater Ipswich Region and surrounding Western Corridor.

Pride were inaugural members of the Men and Women's NPL Queensland competitions, the 2nd tier of Australian football.

Senior Men managers

Senior Women managers

Senior Men squad

Senior Women squad

Honours 
2017: National Premier Leagues Queensland Champions

Competition history (Senior Men)

Source:

The tier is the level in the Australian soccer league system

Competition history (Senior Women)

Source:

The tier is the level in the Australian soccer league system
 Western Pride withdrew from the Senior Women's competition after one match of the 2020 season.

Background

With no existing Ipswich clubs in a position to apply for the newly formed NPL Queensland in 2012, a decision was made to work together to create a representative club for the region. New Pride President Todd Hunt had been calling for Ipswich clubs to work together for the sake of footballers in the region since 2007.

Before World War II, Ipswich had been an important region for Australian football, with a number of Australia national soccer team representatives hailing from the region, including the Socceroos' first captain Alex Gibb.

Ipswich clubs Dinmore Bushrats, Bundamba Rovers, Blackstone Rangers and St Helens won 19 Brisbane Premierships between 1920 and 1957. However, ethnic community clubs formed after World War II migration brought professionalism to club football, drawing players from Ipswich to Brisbane, seeing the fortunes of Ipswich clubs wane. Ipswich would see a brief return to dominance in the mid-1980s when Ipswich United (1985 Premiership/Championship double) and Coalstars SC (1986 Championship) saw the last time the region won a Men's title in the highest division.

Ipswich continued to produce international and professional footballers, but the rate slowed dramatically. Most recently Coalstars SC produced Australia women's national soccer team FIFA Women's World Cup players Belinda Kitching and Bryony Duus, Socceroo Neil Kilkenny, and Everton F.C., Stoke City F.C. and Crewe Alexandra F.C. goalkeeper Jason Kearton.

Western Pride was created in 2012 when a group of Ipswich football identities and local clubs Ipswich Knights FC, Western Spirit FC, Ipswich City FC, Springfield United and Colleges United formed Football Ipswich with a view of creating a club to meet the entry requirements to the then Australian Premier League (now National Premier Leagues Queensland).

Western Pride was created to provide a more professional pathway for Ipswich youngsters within the city, having seen many young Ipswich players move to successful Brisbane clubs such as Olympic FC and Queensland Lions FC.

History
Pride's inaugural men's player/coach was former Socceroo Kasey Wehrman who led the team from 2012 until his resignation in July 2014 to return to Norway.

In October 2014, former A-League player Karl Dodd accepted the position of Head Coach of the Western Pride FC Senior Men's Team in the National Premier League (Qld). Former Matilda Karla Reuter signed on as Assistant Manager of the Men's team.

Dodd led the team to an impressive start to the season, however in June 2015 he was recruited by Brisbane Roar FC to take up a position as the High Performance Manager.

Dodd was replaced by former Whitsunday Miners FC coach Graham Harvey.

Pride Women's team first appeared in the SEQ Premier League, and were coached by Byron Hellmuth. In 2015 Pride gained a licence to the newly formed NPL Queensland Women'scompetition.  Byron Hellmuth and New player/coach Lorena Maggio led the team to an 8th-placed finish.

On 18 May 2016 Pride Men played the New Zealand national football team at Briggs Rd Sporting Complex as part of the visitors preparations for the OFC Nations Cup. New Zealand prevailed 2–0 in front of a crowd of 1,200 fans.

Pride Men signed Papua New Guinea international Nigel Dabinyaba late in the season, who became the first current international to play in the NPL Queensland competition.

Two of Pride's 2016 squad were signed by Brisbane Roar's Youth team. Hayden Mchenery signed mid-season after 12 months at Pride where he rebuilt his career after suffering osteitis pubis. Joe Duckworth signed at the end of the season after top scoring for Pride with 11 goals in 21 appearances.

2017 season

Former Australia women's national soccer team goalkeeper and Ipswich player Belinda Kitching was appointed manager of the Senior Women side during the off-season.

Kitching was joined by her former Ipswich and international teammate Bryony Duus who took up the role of U17 manager and assistant coach to the Senior Women's squad.

Former playerHarrison Sawyer re-signed for the Men's side after stints at A-League sides Brisbane Roar and Newcastle United Jets. He scored four hat-tricks in five games, and 15 goals in his 7 games back with the club before returning to professional football in the Philippines.

In the final round of the regular season Pride Men secured a historic 3rd-placed finish and a first-ever club finals series following a run of 9 straight victories. Pride won the right to host the Grand Final after defeating Gold Coast City FC 3–0 in the semi-final, and seeing Premiers Brisbane Strikers lose to 4th place Moreton Bay United FC in the other semi.

Pride defeated Moreton Bay 2–1 in the Grand Final at Briggs Rd in front of a crowd of 3383. Goals from Cameron Crestani and a last minute Dylan Wenzel-Halls free-kick gave Pride its first major trophy.

Two weeks earlier Pride's U18 Boys won the Premiership – the club's first competition win at any level in its five-year history.

Pride Women finished second-last after a string of injuries deprived the team of many of its experienced players. A decision was taken to promote U17 players with a view to giving them experience ahead of the 2018 season.

2018 season
Striker Dylan Wenzel-Halls scored 23 goals in 11 appearances, before being signed by Brisbane Roar on a professional contract.

Coach Graham Harvey lead Pride to 2nd in the table by Round 16, before departing to take up a professional contract in Hong Kong.

Notable players
List of current and former players who played professionally or have represented their nation at senior level.
Afghanistan
 Zelfy Nazary

Australia
 Kasey Wehrman

Papua New Guinea
 Nigel Dabinyaba

Samoa
 Mariecamilla Ah Ki

A-League
 Russell Woodruffe
 Harry Sawyer
 Cameron Crestani
 Dylan Wenzel-Halls
 Adam Sawyer
 Alex Parsons (footballer, born 2000)
 Daniel Hall (soccer)

W-League
 Lorena Maggio
 Elli Chapple
 Danielle Ward
 Meaghan McElligott
 Abbey Lloyd
 Kara Mowbray

Singapore Premier League
 Andy Pengelly

South African Premier League
 Alistair Wallis

References

National Premier Leagues clubs
Soccer clubs in Queensland
Association football clubs established in 2012
2012 establishments in Australia
Sport in Ipswich, Queensland